TNTP, formerly known as The New Teacher Project, is an organization in the United States with a mission of ensuring that poor and minority students get equal access to effective teachers. It helps urban school districts and states recruit and train new teachers, staff challenged schools, design evaluation systems, and retain teachers who have demonstrated the ability to raise student achievement.  TNTP is a non-profit organization that was founded by Michelle Rhee in 1997.

Overview

A national nonprofit organization founded by teachers, TNTP is driven by the belief that effective teachers have a greater impact on student achievement than any other school or social factor. In response, TNTP develops customized programs and policy interventions that enable education leaders to find, develop, and retain great teachers. Since its inception in 1997, TNTP has recruited or trained approximately 43,000 teachers - mainly through its Teaching Fellows programs - who have taught an estimated 7 million students. TNTP has also released a series of studies of the policies and practices that affect the quality of the nation's teacher workforce, including The Widget Effect (2009), Teacher Evaluation 2.0 (2010), and The Irreplaceables (2012). In 2013, TNTP is active in more than 25 cities, including 10 of the nation's 15 largest.
In a New York Daily News opinion piece, Timothy Daly, President of TNTP, advocated for "making student test scores one of many factors in the tenure decision."

History
TNTP was founded in 1997 by Michelle Rhee.  It began with the aim of giving poor and minority students equal access to effective teachers. During its first 10 years, TNTP initially focused on helping urban districts improve the way they recruited, trained, and hired new teachers.  In the year 2000, TNTP began the Teaching Fellows and Academy programs, which served as alternate routes to teacher certification for high-need schools.  Today, TNTP also works with states and district public schools in the areas of measurement and management of teachers’ performance.

As it became increasingly familiar with the needs of urban districts, TNTP began helping districts identify and address additional challenges, including hiring teachers earlier, staffing challenged schools and providing rigorous teacher certification training. It also began identifying policies counterproductive to overcoming these challenges and publishing reports to offer solutions and encourage reform.

Business model
TNTP is a revenue-generating nonprofit. The majority of its revenue comes from contracts with districts and states to supply services; additional funding for new program development and research is provided by donors such as the Bill & Melinda Gates Foundation.

Reports

The Widget Effect (2009)

In 2009, TNTP published The Widget Effect: Our National Failure to Acknowledge and Act Upon Teacher Effectiveness. The report, which surveyed over 15,000 teachers and 1,300 principals in 12 school districts, concluded that the U.S. public education system treats teachers as interchangeable parts, rather than individual professionals. American Federation of Teachers (AFT) President Randi Weingarten provided a public statement of support for the report, saying it “points the way to a credible, fair, accurate and effective teacher evaluation system that would improve teaching and learning.”  The National Education Policy Center (NEPC) review of The Widget Effect praised the overall quality of the report but said, "'it is unclear ... how and why particular districts were selected, and whether they represent the range of teacher evaluation practices being implemented in school districts and states across the United States.' Omissions in the report's description of its methodology (e.g., sampling strategy and survey response rates) and its sample lead to questions about the generalizability of the findings."

Teacher Evaluation 2.0 (2010)

The National Education Policy Center was critical of TNTP's report Teacher Evaluation 2.0, which, it said, contained "recommendations for teacher evaluation [that] boil down, for the most part, to truisms and conventional wisdom, lacking a supporting presentation of scholarly evidence." The review also claimed that "many of the ideas and recommendations are neither new nor innovative."

The Irreplaceables (2012)
In 2012, TNTP published The Irreplaceables: Understanding the Real Retention Crisis in America’s Urban Schools. The study identified the failure of public schools to keep more of their strongest teachers (or “irreplaceables”) in the classroom than their weakest as the fundamental problem with teacher retention in urban school districts. The report, which focused on four large urban school districts, also offered solutions for how districts and schools can help keep more of their best teachers.

Upon The Irreplaceables’ release, U.S. Secretary of Education Arne Duncan publicly supported TNTP’s findings  and the National Education Association (NEA) praised the report, noting that TNTP had “helped focus attention on one of our nation’s most valuable assets: the dedicated professionals who educate our children.”

Teacher Preparation Programs
2008 data from Louisiana showed “that TNTP teachers outperform beginning and experienced teachers in math, reading, and language arts.” In 2010, a state-sponsored study assessed the effectiveness of newly certified teachers in Louisiana. Out of 17 teacher preparation providers, TNTP was the only one to earn top marks in 4 of 5 subject areas.  A 2010 study out of Louisiana State University indicated TNTP Practitioner Program is one of a group of programs in that state “producing teachers who in aggregate appear to be making a positive contribution to student achievement from the time they complete their training program and begin teaching" insofar as they are programs "whose results were generally consistent with the student achievement results of experienced certified teachers" (the other programs were The Louisiana State University - Shreveport NM/CO program and Southeastern Louisiana University Master's Alternate Certification program). In 2009, a report by the Center for American Progress, U.S. Chamber of Commerce, and the American Enterprise Institute included TNTP along with certain public school districts, charter school entrepreneurs, and other independent organizations as “addressing stubborn challenges by pursuing familiar notions of good teaching and effective schooling in impressively coherent, disciplined, and strategic ways.” In particular, it stated that TNTP has "demonstrated a strong record, validated by independent research, of bringing nontraditional applicants into the classroom."

Controversy
In June 2009, TNTP published its Widget Effect report on teacher evaluation, conducted in collaboration with over 50 district and state officials and 25 teachers union representatives. Although the American Federation of Teachers agreed that the “overall conclusions of the report are sound,” the union disputed the data on the number of teachers dismissed in Toledo, Ohio.  Later, it was reported that at least some of the data were incorrect.
According to a memorandum issued by TNTP, after the Toledo Federation of Teachers (TFT) contacted TNTP with concerns over their data, TNTP responded by reviewing new data provided by the TFT and then reconciling the Toledo Public Schools teacher dismissal data.

See also

 Alternative teaching certification
 Education in the United States
 StudentsFirst

References

External links
 TNTP
 TNTP Teaching Fellows
 Teachers Retirement Planning

Educational organizations based in the United States
Teacher training programs
Non-profit organizations based in New York City
Organizations established in 1997